Radio + TV Rijmond, usually abbreviated as RTV Rijnmond, is a public broadcast organization for the Rijnmond region of the Netherlands.

Logos

References

External links

Radio stations in the Netherlands
Television channels in the Netherlands
Television channels and stations established in 1989